"Male Unbonding" is the fourth episode of the first season of the NBC sitcom Seinfeld and aired on June 14, 1990. Despite airing fourth, it was the second episode produced.

In it, Jerry Seinfeld tries to avoid meeting an old childhood friend, Joel Horneck (Kevin Dunn). Jerry's neighbor, Kramer, conceptualizes "a pizza place where you make your own pie". The episode was written by Larry David and Jerry Seinfeld, and was the first filmed episode directed by Tom Cherones. This was the first episode produced with Elaine Benes (Julia Louis-Dreyfus) as a character. It also was the first episode to use Jonathan Wolff's title music. This is the only Seinfeld episode whose title does not begin with the definite article "The".

Plot
George tells Jerry that he was out with a girlfriend. They went to see a play, during which he put his hand in his pocket to get some money and accidentally got some dental floss stuck to his hand. George worries that his girlfriend is going to leave him because of it.

Jerry has problems with a childhood friend, Joel Horneck, who persists in keeping in touch with him. He does not like Horneck, who does not pay attention to anything that Jerry says. Jerry says that he feels uncomfortable "breaking up with" Horneck, so George suggests that he should pretend that Horneck is a woman and break up normally. Jerry therefore attempts to break up with Horneck at Monk's Café, but Horneck bursts into tears. Deeply uncomfortable, Jerry assures Horneck he didn't mean it, and agrees to take him to see the New York Knicks, although he was supposed to take George.

As George tells Jerry that his girlfriend no longer wants to see him, Jerry tells George that he gave away his ticket to Horneck. Although Jerry offers George his own ticket, George does not go to the game with Horneck because he does not know Horneck. Jerry decides to give Horneck both tickets, claiming that he cannot make the game because he is tutoring his nephew. Later, the night of the Knicks game, Jerry is in his apartment talking to his ex-girlfriend Elaine. She jokingly tries to add to Jerry's list of excuses with which he avoids Horneck. He later discovers that Horneck took Kramer to the game and that Horneck is in the building. When Horneck meets Jerry and Elaine, Horneck invites them out to another Knicks game. They come up with more unusual excuses in an attempt to avoid going out. However, Horneck then gets out a newspaper and tries to organize a time when they can all meet, weeks in advance. Jerry realizes that no matter what excuses he comes up with, he cannot avoid Horneck.

Kramer, working under the name "Kramerica Industries", conceptualizes building "a pizza place where you make your own pizza pie". Jerry and George try to persuade Kramer to forget the idea, but Kramer is determined to go on with it. Kramer's pizza parlor idea reappears in later episodes such as "The Puffy Shirt" in season 5, and "The Couch" in season 6.

Production
This is the first episode that was made after the original pilot, "The Seinfeld Chronicles". The title of the series was shortened to Seinfeld to avoid confusion with another sitcom called The Marshall Chronicles.

This is the only episode that does not have "the" in the title. A decision was made to name all the episodes in this way so that the writers would not waste time trying to think of funny titles and instead make the content of the episode funny. However, this decision was made after the script for "Male Unbonding" was completed. Jerry Seinfeld tried to have the title of the episode changed to "The Male Unbonding" some time later, but was unsuccessful.

This is the first episode written which stars the character of Elaine. The first version of the script does not include Elaine, despite the fact that one of the conditions given when Seinfeld was given a series was that a female character was included. Originally, the character's name was Eileen. Louis-Dreyfus claims that she was unhappy with only being given one scene in the first episode in which she appeared, but said that she performed well in the episode. Similarly, other early versions of the script refer to the character of Kramer as "Breckman". Kevin Dunn, who plays Joel in the episode, auditioned for the role of George Costanza in the original pilot. The episode also stars Anita Wise, who plays a waitress. Wise appeared again in another episode from the first season of Seinfeld titled "The Robbery". Frank Piazza, a customer at the bank appears in the season 2 episode "The Stranded".

This episode features different title music from the pilot; this music, composed by Jonathan Wolff, is used throughout the rest of the series. The standup interstitials for this episode were recorded twice. Originally, the set for the interstitials was brightly lit and was designed to look like that of a church basement, but then it was remade to look like a nightclub and the material was performed again. The scene that was set in the bank was originally set in a dry cleaner's. However, this was moved and some of the material was moved to a later episode called "The Stock Tip".

The episode had an alternative ending, in which Joel borrows a k.d. lang tape from Jerry. Jerry then finally manages to "break up" with Joel. Joel leaves, but then comes back again to tell Jerry that he will bring back the tape. Jerry then refers to Joel as Jason from the Friday the 13th films. "Male Unbonding" was filmed on February 13, 1990.

Reception
When first broadcast on June 14, 1990, the episode attracted a Nielsen rating of 13.6/24, meaning that 13.6% of American households watched the episode, and that 24% of all televisions in use at the time were tuned into it. Several reviews at the time compared Seinfeld to It's Garry Shandling's Show, in which Garry Shandling, like Seinfeld, plays a fictionalized version of himself.

Jonathan Boudreaux writes that of the four season one episodes produced after the pilot, "'Male Unbonding' is the strongest. This episode centers on the classic Seinfeld theme of the gang complaining about an outsider's self-centeredness while conveniently ignoring their own selfish, antisocial behavior. The characters slowly begin to fall into place as George takes great strides toward being the neurotic moron we love, and Kramer becomes more spastic and idiosyncratic."

Colin Jacobson for DVD Movie Guide was also positive, saying, "'Unbonding' marks a demonstrable improvement over the pilot. No one will mistake the episode for one of the series' greats, but at least the characters start to resemble the ones we'd come to know later. In addition, it tosses out just enough humor to make it enjoyable." David Sims of The A.V. Club gave the episode a B+, saying, "It's a pretty funny episode – my main criticism is just that at this point, Kramer isn't integrated at all into the stories, rather he just comes by and dispenses weird dialog for a couple minutes."

References

External links
 Seinfeld, Volume 1, Seasons 1 & 2
 Official Seinfeld Web site
 

Seinfeld (season 1) episodes
1990 American television episodes
Television episodes written by Larry David
Television episodes written by Jerry Seinfeld